Devil Peak is a summit in the U.S. state of Nevada.

The mountain's name comes from the Native Americans of the area, who named the summit "dwelling place of evil spirits". Variant names were "Big Devil", "Diablo Grande", "Lookout", "Lookout Mountain", "Lookout Peak" and "Mount Diablo".

References

Mountains of Clark County, Nevada